A Virgin Compilation is a United States promo compilation album by Mike Oldfield released by Virgin Records in 1987.

The black and white album cover is in the same style as the other American releases at the time, Islands and "Magic Touch".

Both versions of "Magic Touch" that appear on the album feature Max Bacon on vocals.

Track listing 
 "Magic Touch" – 4:13
 "Magic Touch" (Edit) – 3:35
 "Tubular Bells" (Edit) – 3:18
 "Family Man" – 3:46
 "Flying Start" – 3:36
 "Moonlight Shadow" – 3:37
 "Shadow on the Wall" (12" version) – 5:08
 "Five Miles Out" – 4:17
 "Étude" (Single version) – 3:05
 "Jungle Gardenia" – 2:43
 "North Point" – 3:31

References 

Mike Oldfield compilation albums
1987 compilation albums
Virgin Records compilation albums